Kirsten Flipkens was the defending champion but did not complete in the Juniors this year.

Kateryna Bondarenko defeated Ana Ivanovic in the final, 6–4, 6–7(2–7), 6–2 to win the girls' singles tennis title at the 2004 Wimbledon Championships.

This Wimbledon Girls' Singles event featured four future singles world No. 1 players, in Ana Ivanovic, Caroline Wozniacki, Victoria Azarenka and Angelique Kerber. During the tournament, there were two clashes between them, with Azarenka defeating Kerber at an early stage and then losing in the semifinals to Ivanovic.

Seeds

  Michaëlla Krajicek (semifinals)
  Nicole Vaidišová (quarterfinals)
  Ana Ivanovic (final)
  Shahar Pe'er (quarterfinals)
  Chan Yung-jan (second round)
  Kateryna Bondarenko (champion)
  Monica Niculescu (first round)
  Alisa Kleybanova (quarterfinals)
  Victoria Azarenka (semifinals)
  Olga Govortsova (third round)
  Marina Erakovic (third round)
  Veronika Chvojková (first round)
  Jessica Kirkland (second round)
  Ryōko Fuda (first round)
  Irina Kotkina (third round)
  Mădălina Gojnea (first round)

Draw

Finals

Top half

Section 1

Section 2

Bottom half

Section 3

Section 4

References

External links

Girls' Singles
Wimbledon Championship by year – Girls' singles